is a crossover V-Cinema release featuring the casts of Kaitou Sentai Lupinranger VS Keisatsu Sentai Patranger and Uchu Sentai Kyuranger. It was released in Japanese theaters on May 3, 2019, and on DVD and Blu-ray on August 21, 2019.

Plot
The Lupinrangers are approached by alien pop star Hoshi Minato and his manager Jerataro, who demand money from them, when the Patrangers intervene. Suddenly, Lucky of the Kyurangers falls from the sky, allowing Minato and Jerataro to kidnap the Lupinrangers while the Patrangers arrest Lucky. After confirming that their captors are unable to help them in their quest to regain the Lupin Collection, the Lupinrangers break free. However, they overhear Minato and Jerataro saying they are stranded from their universe after they were dragged into a dimensional rift and agree to help them just as the BN Thieves Balance and Naga Ray appear, claiming they want Minato's guitar and join forces to ransom the Lupinrangers for the Patrangers's equipment, the guitar, and money. During the exchange, Gangler member Rirus Lipig appears and steals the guitar, forcing the Lupinrangers to use the Patrangers's gear to transform, but fail to prevent the enemy from escaping due to their unfamiliarity with them.

Meanwhile, Space Federation President Tsurugi Ohtori appears at the Patrangers' headquarters to help Lucky get released and reveal the Kyurangers's true objective is to stop Don Arkage, a Jark Matter remnant who escaped from their universe. Concurrently, Kyuranger members Stinger, Hammie, and Spada search for Lucky, but track Minato's guitar to a warehouse, where the Lupinrangers and BN thieves learn that Lipig is working with Don Arkage, who intends to use the Hyper Planedium in Minato's guitar to become invincible. The Lupinrangers and Kyurangers confront the two and defeat Lipig, but Don Arkage takes the guitar and absorbs its Hyper Planedium. Lucky fights back, but is severely injured by Don Arkage, who vows to return the next day to claim the Earth.

While Lucky is recovering, he reveals he attacked Don Arkage to prevent him from being fully bathed in the Hyper Planedium and create a weak spot. The next day, the Patrangers, Lupinrangers, and Kyurangers join forces to confront Don Arkage. During the battle, they are suddenly and briefly joined by Misao Mondo of the Zyuohgers. Together, the heroes defeat Don Arkage, but the enemy enlarges himself, leading to the Lupinrangers and Patrangers to form the mecha Good Cool Kaiser VSX and use the Kyurangers's powers to destroy him. After the battle, the Lupinrangers and Patrangers bid farewell to the Kyurangers who return to their own universe.

Cast
Lupinranger VS Patranger cast
: 
: 
: 
: 
: 
: 
: 
: 
: 

Kyuranger cast
: 
: 
: 
: 
: 
: 
: 
: 

Zyuohger cast
: 

Movie-exclusive cast
Announcer: 

Voice cast
: 
: 
: 
: M·A·O
, Narration: 
: 
: 
: 
: 
: 
: 
Kyuranger Equipment Voice: 
Zyuohger Equipment Voice:

Theme song

Lyrics: Shou Ronpo, 
Composition: 
Arrangement:  (Project.R)
Artist: Project.R

References

External links
(In Japanese)

Toei tokusatsu films
2010s science fiction films
Crossover tokusatsu films
2019 films
2010s Japanese superhero films
Arsène Lupin
Films based on classical mythology